The 1964 Pennsylvania 200 was a NASCAR Grand National Series event that was held on July 21, 1964, at Lincoln Speedway in New Oxford, Pennsylvania.

Race report
There were 21 drivers on the grid; all of them were American-born males. Frank Tanner received the last-place finish due to an oil pressure issue on lap 2 out of the 200 laps that made up the regulation length of the race. There were only two lead changes; David Pearson managed to defeat Richard Petty by 11 seconds in only one hour and twelve minutes.

Bob Welborn would retire from NASCAR after this race; having gone winless since the 1959 Western North Carolina 500. Wendell Scott managed to charge ahead from a disappointing 21st place to a respectable fourth place during the course of the race. There were only 2 cautions in this race; making it relatively safe even by today's standards.

Notable crew chiefs that participated in this race included Jimmy Helms, Vic Ballard, Bob Cooper, Dale Inman and Wendell Scott (who also owned the vehicle and drove it in the same race).

The transition to purpose-built racecars began in the early 1960s and occurred gradually over that decade.  Changes made to the sport by the late 1960s brought an end to the "strictly stock" vehicles of the 1950s.

Qualifying

Finishing order
Section reference:

 David Pearson (No. 6)
 Richard Petty (No. 41)
 Jimmy Pardue (No. 54)
 Wendell Scott (No. 34)
 Doug Yates (No. 72)
 Curtis Crider (No. 02)
 Al White (No. 31)
 Doug Cooper (No. 60)
 Roy Tyner (No. 9)
 Bob Derrington (No. 68)
 Bob Welborn* (No. 06)
 Earl Brooks* (No. 55)
 Neil Castles* (No. 88)
 Elmo Langley* (No. 64)
 Ned Jarrett* (No. 11)
 Louis Weathersbee* (No. 45)
 Doug Moore* (No. 49)
 LeeRoy Yarbrough* (No. 03)
 Bernard Alvarez* (No. 10)
 Pete Boland* (No. 01) 
 Frank Tanner* (No. 66)

* Driver failed to finish race

Timeline
Section reference:
 Start of race: Bob Welborn started the race with the pole position.
 Lap 2: Oil pressure issues made Frank Tanner the last-place finish; Pete Boland had issues with steering his racing vehicle.
 Lap 4: Ignition problems forced Doug Moore to stop racing for the remainder of the day.
 Lap 10: Louis Weatherbee had a terminal crash, forcing him to withdraw from the event.
 Lap 32: Ned Jarrett had an issue with his engine, causing him to exit the race.
 Lap 50: Elmo Langley noticed that his brakes no longer worked, ending his day on the track.
 Lap 107: The rear end of Neil Castles' vehicle became a concern to NASCAR officials, forcing him to exit the race.
 Lap 109: Transmission issues took away Earl Brooks' chance of winning the race.
 Lap 126: David Pearson takes over the lead from Bob Welborn.
 Lap 169: Bob Welborn developed engine issues; forcing him to leave the race.
 Finish: David Pearson was officially declared the winner of the event.

References

Pennsylvania 200
Pennsylvania 300
NASCAR races at Lincoln Speedway (Pennsylvania)